German submarine U-87 was a Type VIIB U-boat of Nazi Germany's Kriegsmarine during World War II. The submarine was laid down on 18 April 1940 at the Flender Werke (yard) at Lübeck as yard number 283 and launched on 21 June 1941. She was commissioned on 21 June under the command of Kapitänleutnant Joachim Berger. U-87 trained with 6th U-boat Flotilla until 1 December 1941, when she was put on front-line service.

U-87 sank five ships in her one-year career; she was a member of five wolfpacks.

She was sunk off the coast of Leixões in Portugal during her fifth combat patrol, in March 1943, by warships of the Canadian Navy.

Design
German Type VIIB submarines were preceded by the shorter Type VIIA submarines. U-87 had a displacement of  when at the surface and  while submerged. She had two shafts and two  propellers.

U-87 was fitted with five  torpedo tubes (four fitted at the bow and one at the stern), fourteen torpedoes, one  SK C/35 naval gun, 220 rounds, and one  anti-aircraft gun The boat had a complement of between forty-four and sixty.

Service history

First patrol
U-87 sailed from Kiel on 24 December 1941, and headed out into the Atlantic via the North Sea. On the evening of 31 December, the boat encountered the Cardita, which was straggling behind convoy HX 166, bound for Shellhaven. A single torpedo hit the vessel, resulting in the deaths of twenty-seven crew members.

Meanwhile, U-87 completed her voyage around the British isles and crossed the Atlantic, where on 17 January, the submersible struck again. The Norwegian vessel Nyholt was nearing the completion of convoy ON-52s journey from Reykjavík to New York. Attempting to divert further from their course to reach Newfoundland, U-87 reacted poorly to the movement and four subsequent torpedoes missed. Another two hits failed to sink the tanker, and U-87 was forced to surface for its crew to fire the deck gun as the ship's crew took to their lifeboats, not to be rescued for another nine days.

U-87 was damaged by gunfire from the tanker, and re-crossed the Atlantic, to arrive at La Pallice in France on 30 January 1942 after 38 days at sea.

Second patrol
Neither Tirpitz nor U-87 sank any ships; the submarine returned to France, but to St. Nazaire on 27 March.

Third patrol
U-87 sailed on 19 May 1942 and laid a field of 15 TMB mines off Boston. No ships were lost in the minefield; the Allies remained unaware of the mines until after the war. After reloading her tubes with torpedoes, U-87 sank the 8,402 GRT British freighter SS Port Nicholson and the 5,896 GRT American cargo liner Cherokee from convoy XB 25 on 15 June. Eighty-six military personnel drowned. The Port Nicholson was documented to be carrying about 1,707,000 troy ounces of platinum. On 22 June U-87 was damaged off Halifax Harbour, by depth charges from Lockheed Hudson aircraft of 11 Squadron Royal Canadian Air Force. The boat was unable to continue the patrol and returned to port on 8 July.

Fourth patrol
U-87 sailed on 31 August 1942 to patrol off Freetown, where she sank the 7,392 GRT British freighter Agapenor before docking in Brest on 20 November 1942.

Fifth patrol and loss
U-87 sailed on 9 January 1943, and was sunk by depth charges from Canadian warships, the corvette  and the destroyer  during an unsuccessful 4 March attack on convoy KMS 10G. On this last patrol she had 50 crewmen on board, none of whom survived the sinking.

Wolfpacks
U-87 took part in five wolfpacks, namely:
 Zieten (6 – 17 January 1942) 
 Westwall (2 – 12 March 1942) 
 Iltis (6 – 23 September 1942) 
 Delphin II (20 January – 9 February 1943) 
 Rochen (9 – 26 February 1943)

Summary of raiding history

References

Bibliography

External links

German Type VIIB submarines
U-boats commissioned in 1941
U-boats sunk in 1943
World War II submarines of Germany
World War II shipwrecks in the Atlantic Ocean
1941 ships
Ships built in Lübeck
U-boats sunk by depth charges
U-boats sunk by Canadian warships
Ships lost with all hands
Maritime incidents in March 1943